Joel Hanley (born June 8, 1991) is a Canadian professional ice hockey defenceman for the  Dallas Stars of the National Hockey League (NHL). Undrafted, Hanley has previously played for the Montreal Canadiens and Arizona Coyotes.

Playing career
Hanley was born in Keswick, Ontario. As a youth, he played in the 2004 Quebec International Pee-Wee Hockey Tournament with the York-Simcoe Express minor ice hockey team.

Hanley played Junior A with the Newmarket Hurricanes before spending four seasons with the UMass Minutemen ice hockey of the NCAA. Following his college career, he signed his first professional contract with the American Hockey League's Portland Pirates; He spent two seasons between 2013 and 2015 in Portland including a short demotion to the ECHL's Gwinnett Gladiators.

On July 1, 2015, Hanley signed a one-year, two-way contract with the Montreal Canadiens. He began the 2015–16 season with the Canadiens' affiliate, the St. John's IceCaps. On March 20, 2016, the Canadiens recalled him. He made his NHL debut that evening in a 4–1 loss to the Calgary Flames. Two nights later, he recorded his first two career NHL points with two assists in a 4–3 win over the Anaheim Ducks. He finished the season with six assists in ten games for the Canadiens, and 13 points in 64 games for the IceCaps.

On June 22, 2016, the Canadiens signed Hanley to a one-year, two-way contract extension. He spent the majority of the 2016–17 season with the IceCaps.

On July 1, 2017, Hanley signed a one-year, two-way contract with the Arizona Coyotes. He appeared in five games for the Coyotes during the 2017–18 season, as well as 52 for the American Hockey League's (AHL) Tucson Roadrunners.

On July 1, 2018, Hanley signed a one-year, two-way contract with the Dallas Stars. On February 20, 2019, the Stars signed Hanley to a two-year contract extension. He split the 2018–19 season between Dallas (16 games) and their AHL affiliate the Texas Stars (60 games). On May 1, 2019, he made his NHL playoff debut in Game 4 of the Stars' second round matchup against the St. Louis Blues. It was his lone postseason appearance, as he suffered an upper-body injury.

On September 10, 2020, Hanley recorded his first career playoff point, assisting on Jamie Benn's goal during Game 3 of the Western Conference Finals against the Vegas Golden Knights. On September 19, he scored his first career NHL goal in a 4–1 win over the Tampa Bay Lightning during Game 1 of the 2020 Stanley Cup Finals. On April 14, 2021, he signed a two-year contract extension with Dallas.

Career statistics

References

External links

1991 births
Living people
Arizona Coyotes players
Canadian ice hockey defencemen
Dallas Stars players
Gwinnett Gladiators players
Ice hockey people from Ontario
Montreal Canadiens players
People from the Regional Municipality of York
Portland Pirates players
St. John's IceCaps players
Texas Stars players
Tucson Roadrunners players
UMass Minutemen ice hockey players
Undrafted National Hockey League players